Wat Sam Phran is a Buddhist temple (wat) in Amphoe Sam Phran, Nakhon Pathom province, around 40 kilometers to the west of Bangkok. The temple was officially registered in 1985. In English, the wat is sometimes referred to as the "Dragon Temple".

The temple is notable for its 17-story tall pink cylindrical building with a gigantic red-and-green dragon sculpture curling around the entire height. The interior of the dragon feature is hollow and contains a spiraling flight of stairs, which has however deteriorated to a poor condition in places. It also contains a huge Buddha statue as well as many additional Buddhist statues. The Wat Samphran is 80 meters high because Buddha died at the age of 80 years old.

Several of the temple's clergy were involved in a sexual assault scandal that resulted in long prison sentences in 2004.

References 

Visionary environments
Buddhist temples in Nakhon Pathom Province